Liu Qi (born September 1957) is a Chinese politician who served as the Communist Party Secretary of Jiangxi from 2018 to 2021, and previously served as the Governor of Jiangxi from 2016 to 2018. Liu spent most of his career in Zhejiang province.

Career
Liu Qi was born in Yishui County, Shandong. During the Cultural Revolution, Liu became a rusticated youth performing manual labour in Wuyi County. He graduated from Zhejiang University with a degree in chemical engineering, and also has a graduate degree from Xi'an Jiaotong University and a doctorate in economics.

After graduating university, Liu was given a job at a state-owned chemical engineering company in Quzhou, where he rose from a dispatcher to the chief executive. He then took on jobs in the provincial department of petroleum, the provincial planning agency, then at Quzhou-based Juhua Corporation, before entering politics as mayor of Wenzhou, then head of the Zhejiang provincial Development and Reform Commission. During this period he worked directly under then Zhejiang party chief Xi Jinping.

In 2008, Liu was named head of the provincial federation of trade unions, and in January 2011, the mayor of Ningbo. He succeeded Wang Huizhong to become party chief of Ningbo in April 2013, and was transferred to Jiangxi in 2016. He had only been the deputy party chief of Jiangxi for several months when he was promoted one step further to become acting Governor of Jiangxi in July 2016, confirmed on September 28, 2016.

On March 21, 2018, Liu was appointed as the Communist Party Secretary of Jiangxi.

On 23 October 2021, he was appointed vice chairperson of the National People's Congress Environment Protection and Resources Conservation Committee.

References

1957 births
Governors of Jiangxi
People from Linyi
Living people
Zhejiang University alumni
Xi'an Jiaotong University alumni
Mayors of Ningbo
Members of the 19th Central Committee of the Chinese Communist Party
Delegates to the 12th National People's Congress
Delegates to the 10th National People's Congress